Kabun may refer to:

 Kabun (Rokan Hulu), district in Rokan Hulu Regency, Indonesia
 Kabun (name), Japanese personal name
 Kabun, a wind god, no further information may be found under: Anishinaabe traditional beliefs